Philippe Monnier (2 November 1864 – 21 July 1911) was a Swiss writer in the French language.

Publications 
Most of his writings dealt with his birthplace of Geneva and its region, from where he originated. He also wrote on the history of Italy and the arts of Italy.  He died, aged 46, in Plainpalais.

 Venise au XVIIIe siècle, Tallandier, 2009 
 Venise au XVIIIe siècle, Complexe, 2001 
 Le livre de Blaise, Lausanne, Éditions Plaisir de Lire, réédité : l'Âge d'Homme, 1998 
 Introduction au Quattrocento, Complexe, 1995 
 Mon village, Genève, J. Jullien, 1927
 Jeunes ménages, Genève, J. Jullien et fils, 1926
 La Genève de Töpffer, Genève, A. Jullien, 1914 (a reference to Rodolphe Töpffer)
 Souvenirs de Kientzheim, Colmar, J.-B. Jung, 1888
 Vers bellettriens, Genève, Jules-Gme Fick, 1888

References

External links 
Philippe Monnier at Éditions Plaisir de Lire.

1864 births
1911 deaths
Writers from Geneva
Swiss writers in French
19th-century Swiss historians
Swiss male writers
20th-century Swiss historians